The 2010–11 Icelandic Hockey League season was the 20th season of the Icelandic Hockey League, the top level of ice hockey in Iceland. Four teams participated in the league and Skautafelag Akureyrar won the championship.

Regular season

Final 
 Skautafélag Akureyrar - Skautafélag Reykjavíkur 3:2

External links 
 Icelandic Ice Hockey Federation

Icelandic Hockey League
Icelandic Hockey League seasons
2010–11 in Icelandic ice hockey